is a former Japanese football player. He played for Japan national team.

Club career
Omi was born in Tokyo on December 26, 1946. After graduating from Hosei University, he joined Hitachi in 1970. In 1972, the club won Japan Soccer League and Emperor's Cup. In 1973, the club won the 2nd place at Japan Soccer League and Emperor's Cup. He retired in 1974. He played 49 games and scored 8 goals in the league.

National team career
On August 4, 1970, Omi debuted for Japan national team against Thailand. He also played at 1970 Asian Games. He played 5 games and scored 1 goal for Japan in 1970.

Club statistics

National team statistics

References

External links
 
 Japan National Football Team Database

1946 births
Living people
Hosei University alumni
Association football people from Tokyo
Japanese footballers
Japan international footballers
Japan Soccer League players
Kashiwa Reysol players
Footballers at the 1970 Asian Games
Association football forwards
Asian Games competitors for Japan